Furth im Wald (in Czech Brod nad Lesy, resp. The city is known as Drachenstadt (Dragon City), a reference to Furth im Wald's annual Drachenstich (Slaying of the Dragon) play. The Drachenstich, originally part of a Corpus Christi procession, was first mentioned in 1590. As one of the oldest folk plays in the German language, each year actors re-enact the legend of Saint George slaying the dragon. In 2010, the play became notable for using the world's largest walking robot, an animatronic dragon called Tradinno.

Twin towns
Furth im Wald is twinned with:

  Ludres, France
  Furth bei Göttweig, Austria
  Domažlice, Czech Republic

Gallery 
Photographs from the

Sons and daughters of the town

 Aloys Fischer (1880–1937), educator
 Helmut Sturm (1932–2008), painter, member of the group SPUR, from 1980 to 1982 guest professor at the Berlin University of the Arts
 Willibald Utz (1893–1954), officer, most recently Generalleutnant in the Second World War

References

Cham (district)